Gustavo Lima is a Portuguese sailor. Competing in the 2000 Summer Olympics, he finished 6th in the laser class. He improved his position by one place, finishing 5th at the 2004 Olympics.  He finished 4th at the 2008 Summer Olympics. He also competed at the 2012 Summer Olympics in the Men's Laser class.

References

Portuguese male sailors (sport)
Year of birth missing (living people)
Living people
Laser class world champions
Olympic sailors of Portugal
Sailors at the 2000 Summer Olympics – Laser
Sailors at the 2004 Summer Olympics – Laser
Sailors at the 2008 Summer Olympics – Laser
Sailors at the 2012 Summer Olympics – Laser
Sailors at the 2016 Summer Olympics – Laser
World champions in sailing for Portugal